Mervyn Thomas (born 24 May 1965) is a Dominican cricketer. He played in four first-class and six List A matches for the Windward Islands from 1992 to 1996.

See also
 List of Windward Islands first-class cricketers

References

External links
 

1965 births
Living people
Dominica cricketers
Windward Islands cricketers